Mihails Vasiļonoks is a retired Latvian ice-hockey player who played as goalie for Dinamo Riga. He currently is director of hockey operations for HK Liepājas Metalurgs and goalie coach for Latvia national team.
Vasiļenoks was part of USSR team roster for 1976 Canada Cup.

References

1948 births
Living people
People from Vecumnieki Municipality
Latvian ice hockey goaltenders
Soviet ice hockey goaltenders
Dinamo Riga players
Latvian ice hockey coaches